Betty Irene Thorner (born 23 February 1938) is a New Zealand former cricketer who played as an all-rounder, batting left-handed and bowling right-arm medium. She appeared in three Test matches for New Zealand between 1957 and 1961. She played domestic cricket for Wellington.

References

External links
 
 

1938 births
Living people
Sportspeople from Upper Hutt
New Zealand women cricketers
New Zealand women Test cricketers
Wellington Blaze cricketers